The Tongan Crip Gang, or West Side 102st Tonga Crip Gang, is a street gang that is a subset of the Crips gang. The gang is active in the U.S. states of California, Utah and others, as well as a presence in New Zealand, Australia, and Canada. Tongan Crip Gang members are primarily of Pacific Islander descent, mainly Tongan.

History
The Tongan Crip Gang was born in the City of Inglewood, California during the 1970s and 1980s, many Pacific Islanders moved into the high crime-rate areas in Los Angeles County, California. There, Samoan and Tongan Americans formed their own gangs during the 1970s. Many of the Tongan Crip Gang members moved from California to the Salt Lake City, Utah area in the 1980s, and distributed the gang set there.

The Salt Lake City branch of the Tongan Crip Gang  was founded in 1989 after intimidation by Latino gang members in the predominantly Latino neighborhood of Glendale.

Criminal activities

The Tongan Crip Gang's crimes include burglaries, auto theft, selling drugs, home invasions, credit card fraud, bank fraud, federal fraud (theft of federal documents, passports, driver's licenses), witness intimidation, insurance fraud, arson, sex trafficking of minors, impersonation of both state police and federal agents, prostitution, hacking, child pornography, kidnapping, extortion by means of threat to reveal information about the private life of an individual, crimes against the elderly, crimes against Central American Communities and individuals associated with the MS-13 (Mara Salvatrucha Gang), crimes against the disabled, mail fraud and murder.

In 2007, members of the Tongan Crip Gang and the 18 Street Gang were indicted by a federal grand jury for criminal conspiracy in a plot to murder 33 members of a Los Angeles subset of MS-13.

See also

 Gangs in Los Angeles

References

Organizations established in the 1970s
1970s establishments in California
Crips subgroups
Pacific Islands-American gangs
Tongan American
Gangs in Los Angeles